Chehel Gazi or Chehl Gazi, also rendered as Chehil Gazi, in Iran may refer to:
Chehel Gazi, Bushehr
Chehel Gazi alternate name of Chehel Zari-ye Arab, Bushehr Province
Chehel Gazi, Ilam
Chehel Gazi, Kurdistan
Chehil Gazi, Yazd